Orbitel may be:
 Orbitel (Bulgarian company), a wireline telecommunications and Internet service provider with national licences for voice and data
 Orbitel (Colombian company), the international business unit of UNE EPM Telecomunicaciones